The pont Champagne is a covered bridge that crosses the Rivière Vassan near the municipality of Val-d'Or in Abitibi-Témiscamingue, Quebec, Canada.

It is named after an early pioneer, Hervé Champagne. It was painted red in the 1980s, having been grey since the '60s. In 1989 and metal support pillar was added.

The single-lane bridge is of Lattice truss bridge design. This design was modified by the Quebec Ministry of Colonisation and was used for more than 500 covered bridges in Quebec. Thirty-four covered bridges were built in Abitibi, during the colonisation of the region. Today fewer than half of them are extant.

The weight capacity is 12 tonnes. It is cited in the Quebec Cultural Heritage Directory since 2001 but does not benefit from any municipal protection.

Gallery

See also 
 List of covered bridges in Quebec

References 

Buildings and structures in Abitibi-Témiscamingue
Bridges completed in 1941
Covered bridges in Canada
Road bridges in Quebec